The Kite-Eating Tree is a fictional tree featured in the Peanuts comic strip by Charles M. Schulz.

Kite Eating Tree may also refer to one of several Peanuts themed rides at Cedar Fair amusement parks in the United States:

 Kite Eating Tree, Kings Island#Planet Snoopy, Kings Mills, Ohio
 Kite Eating Tree, Cedar Point, Sandusky, Ohio
 Kite Eating Tree, Dorney Park & Wildwater Kingdom, Allentown, Pennsylvania
 Kite Eating Tree, Valleyfair, Shakopee, Minnesota
 Kite Eating Tree, Worlds of Fun, Kansas City, Missouri